Tekovské Lužany is a village and municipality in the Levice District in the Nitra Region of Slovakia.

History
In historical records the village was first mentioned in 1156. The settlement had Hungarian majority in the 17th century according to the Turkish tax census.

Geography
The village lies at an altitude of 156 metres and covers an area of 43.936 km². It has a population of about 2940 people.

Ethnicity
The village is about 62% Slovak, 35% Magyar and 3% Gypsy.

Facilities
The village has a public library, cinema, football pitch.

External links

http://www.statistics.sk/mosmis/eng/run.html

Villages and municipalities in Levice District